No. 30 Squadron ( or LLv.30, from 3 May 1942 Le.Lv.30), renamed No. 30 Fighter Squadron (Finnish: Hävittäjälentolaivue 30 or HLe.Lv.30 on 14 February 1944) was a fighter squadron of the Finnish Air Force during World War II, which had been formed from the disbanded No. 10 Squadron. The No. 30 Sqn was part of Flying Regiment 5.

No. 30 Sqn achieved 39 aerial victories, sank 14 vessels and damaged a further 8 vessels. Ten pilots were lost in air combat and one to anti-aircraft fire (9 aircraft were lost in air combat, and a further 16 in accidents). On November 6, 1942, Captain Veikko Karu, commander of the 3rd Flight, was awarded the Mannerheim Cross for his 7 air victories and for his participation in the sinking of 13 vessels.

Organization

Continuation War
1st Flight (1. Lentue)
2nd Flight (2. Lentue)
3rd Flight (3. Lentue)
2nd Flight of No. 24 Squadron (2./LLv.24)
Detachment Ahola (Osasto Ahola)
1st Flight of No. 24 Squadron (1./Le.Lv.24)
Detachment Luukkanen (Osasto Luukkanen)

The equipment consisted of 30 Fokker D.XXIs, 5 Hawker Hurricane Is, 2 Polikarpov I-16s, 5 Polikarpov I-153s, and 1 Blackburn Ripon IIF. Detachment Luukkanen flew Messerschmitt Bf 109Gs.

Bibliography

External links
Lentolaivue 30
History of the No. 30 Sqn

30